The West Branch Community School District is a rural public school district headquartered in West Branch, Iowa.

It spans across western Cedar County and eastern Johnson County, and serves the city of West Branch, and the surrounding rural areas.

Marty Jimmerson has been the superintendent since 2018, after leaving AGWSR Schools.

List of schools
The West Branch school district operates three schools, all in West Branch:
Hoover Elementary
West Branch Middle School
West Branch High School

West Branch High School

Athletics
The Bears compete in the River Valley Conference in the following sports:

Baseball
Bowling (partnered with Iowa City High)
Basketball (boys and girls)
Cross Country (boys and girls)(partnered with Iowa City High)
Football
 3-time Class 1A State Champions (1989, 1991, 1992)
Golf (boys and girls)
 Boys' - 5-time State Champions (1974, 1989, 1990, 1991, 1992)
Soccer (boys and girls)
Softball
Swimming (boys and girls) (partnered with Iowa City High)
Tennis (boys and girls)
Track and Field (boys and girls)
 Boys' - 2-time Class 2A State Champions (1983, 1984)
Volleyball
Wrestling

See also
List of school districts in Iowa
List of high schools in Iowa

References

External links
 West Branch Community School District

School districts in Iowa
Education in Cedar County, Iowa
Education in Johnson County, Iowa